Gothia is a name given to various places where the Goths lived during their migrations:
 Dacia, referred to as Gothia during the fourth century
 Götaland, the traditionally assumed homeland of the Goths
 the land of the Crimean Goths, referred to as Gothia by the Byzantines and Askuzai in Semitic sources (Hebrew: Ashkenaz).
 Principality of Theodoro, deriving from the Crimean Goths
 Septimania, land in southern France once inhabited by the Visigoths
 Languedoc, larger modern provincial name for the Septimania land of Gothia.
 Marca Hispanica, land in northern Spain whose inhabitants were considered Goths and not Franks in the 8th–10th centuries
 Catalonia, the name being possibly derived from "Gothic land"
  Metropolitanate of Gothia, a diocese of the Patriarchate of Constantinople in the Middle Ages

Gothia may also refer to:
 Gothia Cup, the world's largest annual association football cup by number of contestants, held in Gothenburg
 Gothia Towers, a hotel in Gothenburg.
 Arn de Gothia, a fictional medieval knight created by Jan Guillou
 Gothia, a city on the Euphrates river in the Ramadi (district) of Iraq, between Hit and Ramadi